Kumköy can refer to the following villages in Turkey:

 Kumköy, Cide
 Kumköy, Eceabat
 Kumköy, Serik
 Kilyos, Sarıyer, also known as Kumköy